John Frederick Tobin (January 1, 1880 – October 26, 1954) was an American college football player and coach. Tobin attended the University of Chicago, where he played college football under head coach Amos Alonzo Stagg. He was a "star guard" for the Maroons during the 1904 season. In 1905, he served as head coach at Tulane University alongside assistant Harry Ludlow for the 1905 season. Tulane lost its only game, 5–0, that year. Tulane accused its opponent, LSU, of using ineligible players, and the disagreement resulted in a hiatus of the series until 1911. In October, he returned to play for the Chicago team. In December 1905, he accepted the position of athletic director at Tulane. Tobin graduated from Chicago in June 1906, and passed the Illinois bar examination. He was a member of the Delta Chi fraternity. In 1906, he intended to begin practicing law after coaching at the University of Utah during the upcoming season. He later worked as a judge in Utah. Tobin died of a heart attack on October 26, 1954, in Salt Lake City, Utah.

Head coaching record

References

External links
 

1880 births
1954 deaths
American football guards
Chicago Maroons football players
Nebraska Cornhuskers football players
Nebraska Cornhuskers men's track and field athletes
Tulane Green Wave athletic directors
Tulane Green Wave football coaches
Lawyers from Salt Lake City
Illinois lawyers
University of Chicago Law School alumni
People from Macomb, Illinois
Sportspeople from Lincoln, Nebraska
Players of American football from Nebraska
20th-century American lawyers